Pa'l Mundo is the fourth studio album by Puerto Rican reggaeton duo Wisin & Yandel, released on November 8, 2005, by Machete Music.

The album includes the singles, "Rakata," "Llamé Pa' Verte (Bailando Sexy)," and "Noche de Sexo", each of which were top five hits on the U.S. Billboard Hot Latin Tracks chart. The song "Mayor Que Yo, Pt. 2" is a continuation of the song "Mayor Que Yo" by from the album reggaeton compilation album Mas Flow 2 produced by Luny Tunes. Luny Tunes co-produced the bulk of Pa'l Mundo, assisted by Nely, Tainy, Thilo, and Nesty. A deluxe edition of the album was released on May 16, 2006. The "Deluxe Edition" was nominated for a Lo Nuestro Award for Urban Album of the Year.

Commercial reception 
Pa'l Mundo debuted number thirty on Billboard 200 and number one on Top Latin Albums The Duo become the second only reggaeton act at the time to debut at number one of Billboard Latin Albums selling 30,000 units in it first week. It sold 676,000 units in the US, as of 2017 and more than 1 million copies worldwide, according to their label as of 2007.

It was the 3rd Best Selling Latin Album in The United States of 2006. Pal Mundo reached the Top 10 in Venezuela, Chile and Dominican Republic's retail charts. The album was #7 in Billboard Top Latin Albums of the decade 2000s.

Track listing

The Deluxe Edition
Track #1-19 from standard edition, and includes a second disc and DVD.

Pa'l Mundo: First Class Delivery
Pa'l Mundo: First Class Delivery is the second re-edition of the album, released on July 10, 2007, available only in Spain. The second re-edition contains 7 tracks from Pa'l Mundo, as well as some tracks from Los Vaqueros and other past hits. This album is distributed by Machete Music and El Cartel Records by Daddy Yankee.

Personnel

Juan Luis Morera – Primary artist, vocals and lyrics
Llandel Veguilla – Primary artist, vocals and lyrics
Francisco Saldaña – Audio production, lyrics and executive producer
Gustavo Lopez – Executive producer
Victor Cabrera – Audio production and lyrics
Josias de la Cruz – Audio production and lyrics
Marco Masis – Audio production and lyrics
Arnaldo Santos – Audio production and guitar
Ramón Ayala – Featured artist, vocals and lyrics
Héctor Delgado – Featured artist, vocals and lyrics
Antonio Rivera – Featured artist, vocals and lyrics
Anthony Santos – Featured artist, vocals and lyrics
Luis Cortes – Featured artist, vocals and lyrics
Gadiel Veguilla – Featured artist, vocals and lyrics
Rafael De León – Creative director and graphic design
Antonio Hernandez – Artists and repertoire
Louis Martinez – Photography

Charts

Weekly charts

Year-end charts

Certifications and sales

Release history

Accolades

!align="center"|Ref.
|-
|rowspan="5"|2006
|Pal Mundo
|Latin Billboard Music Awards – Reggaeton Album of the Year
|
|align="center" rowspan="3"|
|-
|rowspan="2"|«Rakata»
|Latin Billboard Music Awards – Hot Latin Song of the Year
|
|-
|Latin Billboard Music Awards – Song of the Year
|
|-
|Pa'l Mundo
|Latin Grammy Awards – Best Urban Music Album
|
|align="center"|
|-
|«Rakata»
|Lo Nuestro Awards – Urban Song of the Year
|
|align="center"|
|-
|rowspan="5"|2007
|«Noche De Sexo»
|Latin Billboard Music Awards – Vocal Duet or Collaboration
|
|align="center" rowspan="3"|
|-
|«Pam Pam»
|Latin Billboard Music Awards – Song of the Year
|
|-
|«Rakata»
|Latin Billboard Music Awards – Latin Ringtone of the Year
|
|-
|Pa'l Mundo: Deluxe Edition
|Lo Nuestro Awards – Urban Album of the Year
|
|align="center" rowspan="2"|
|-
|«Llamé Pa' Verte»
|Lo Nuestro Awards – Urban Song of the Year
|
|}

See also
2005 in Latin music
 List of best-selling Latin albums
List of best-selling Latin albums in the United States

References

2005 albums
Wisin & Yandel albums
Machete Music albums
Albums produced by Luny Tunes
Albums produced by Nely